The Parti marxiste-léniniste du Québec fielded twenty-four candidates in the 2007 provincial election, none of whom were elected. Information about these candidates may be found on this page.

Candidates

Jean-Lesage: Jean Bédard
Jean Bédard is a laundry employee and union advisor. He is a perennial candidate for the Marxist-Leninist Party, having run under its banner in seven federal and six provincial elections. He appears to have been a low-profile candidate; during the 2003 election, the newspaper Le Soleil indicated that it was unable to obtain an interview with him.

References

Candidates in Quebec provincial elections
Quebec 2007